John Henry Duke (born 1867) was a chief inspector with the City of London Police. He was honorary secretary of the City of London Police Athletic Club and captained the team that won the tug of war competition at the 1908 Summer Olympics.

References

External links
 

Olympic gold medallists for Great Britain
Olympic medalists in tug of war
1867 births
Year of death missing
Medalists at the 1908 Summer Olympics
City of London Police officers